William Herbert Peterson (February 26, 1921 – June 2012) was an American economist who wrote on the insights of Ludwig von Mises through teaching, writing, and speaking on the relationship between free enterprise and human liberty. Peterson died in 2012 at the age of 91.

Education and work 
Peterson earned a B.S. (1943) and Ph.D. (1952) degrees in economics from New York University and an M.S. degree from Columbia University (1948). During World War II, he also studied at the Harvard Business School under Navy sponsorship and attended a summer leave seminar at Oxford University.

During his academic career, Peterson served as assistant to the dean, associate professor and professor of economics in the Graduate School of Business Administration of New York University, where he was a colleague and friend of Ludwig von Mises; John David Campbell Professor of American Business in the American Graduate School of International Management in Arizona; Scott L. Probasco. Jr. Professor of Free Enterprise and Director, Center for Economic Education, the University of Tennessee at Chattanooga; Distinguished Burrows T. and Mabel L. Lundy Emeritus Professor of Business Philosophy, Campbell University in North Carolina; Senior Fellow at the Heritage Foundation, where he served as Adjunct Scholar.

Public life 
His experience in business and government included service as Economist and Assistant to the Chairman of the Finance Committee of the United States Steel Corporation, Senior Economic Advisor to the United States Department of Commerce, and economics speech writer on the campaign staff of Richard Nixon. Peterson has served as a consultant for General Electric, General Motors, Republic of the Ivory Coast, Republic of South Vietnam, Time Magazine, Union Carbide, Manufacturers-Hanover Trust, and Southern Company, among others.

In January 1979, Peterson was appointed to be a member of the Federal Drafting Committee of the National Tax-Limitation Committee. Led by Nobel Laureate economist Milton Friedman, this committee composed a draft of a constitutional amendment to limit the growth of the Federal budget.

In 1982, Peterson was sponsored by the U.S. Information Agency to lecture on supply-side economics in Romania, East Germany, Ireland and Canada. For this effort, he won a letter of commendation from President Ronald Reagan.

In 1961, the McKinsey Foundation awarded first prize to Peterson for the best article of the year, "The Case for a North American Common Market," published in Indiana University's Business Horizons. In 1981, the Freedom Foundation at Valley Forge gave Dr. Peterson the Leavey Award for Excellence in Private Enterprise Education. In 1989, the Association of Private Enterprise Education named Dr. Peterson as Distinguished Scholar. In 1990, the Freedoms Foundation at Valley Forge awarded him the George Washington Medal of Honor. In 1991 he was awarded an honorary degree by Universidad Francisco Marroquin in Guatemala. In 1993, Campbell University conferred on him the Dean's Award for Excellence in Teaching.

In 2005 Peterson was awarded the Gary G. Schlarbaum Award for Lifetime Achievement in the Cause of Human Liberty, awarded by the Ludwig von Mises Institute where he was an adjunct scholar.

Writings and speeches 
Peterson published articles in the Harvard Business Review, The Freeman, The Free Market, Washington Times, Challenge Magazine, Monthly Labor Review, Christian Science Monitor, New York Times, Dun's Review, Business Week, Journal of Business, Journal of Economic Literature, Nihon Keizai Shimbun (Tokyo), Die 24t, Farmand (Oslo), Australian (Sydney), Sunday Times (London), and others. He wrote daily articles on Mises.org, and is the author of two tributes to Ludwig von Mises: "Thoughts and Memories" and "Mises: A Turning Point".

For fourteen years, he wrote a regular column for the Wall Street Journal entitled "Reading for Business." Apart from authoring monographs and books including The Great Farm Problem (1959), he contributed entries to McGraw-Hill's Encyclopedia of Economics (1982, 1992). He has appeared as a guest commentator on the national PBS-TV show, Nightly Business Report. He was a member of the "Brain Trust" contributing a column to the Investor's Business Daily.

Peterson generally wrote about economics, education, and politics. He praised capitalism quite often and stressed its necessity for a thriving society, such as in his The Washington Times article "Capitalism Appraised". Peterson also voiced his concern for present-day education standards in writings such as his article in The Free Market titled "School Values, Public and Private", where he states that "America's worry over a general moral erosion in politics and society has coincided with ever-more draconian federal control over education." Many of his writings overlapped in his topics of interest, mixing education with government and relating government to economics and capitalism.

Peterson lectured at the University of the Americas (Mexico City), Harvard University, Princeton University, Redford University, University of Arizona, University of Connecticut, University of Virginia, Florida State University, Chattanooga State, Northwood Institute, Emory & Henry College, Peace College, Lenoir-Rhyne College, Wellesley College, University of New Hampshire and at various professional and trade associations. Many of his speeches discussed topics regarding the Austrian school of economics, following the ideas of Mises.

Editor's Note: Parts of this page have been adapted from the Mises Wiki, the content of which is available under Creative Commons Attribution 3.0 Unported.

List of works

Business 
 Is Business "Administration?," 1981
 Getting Results with Information, May 28, 1992: THe Washington Times

Economics 
 Who Also Pays Business Taxes?, Heritage Foundation and the Mises Institute
 The Bookshelf: How to Curb Competition WHile Trying to Spur It, March 1, 1936: The Wall Street Journal
 The Legacy of Lord Keynes, September 14, 1959: British Society for Individual Freedom: Freedom First
 Peterson's 'Law': An economist's foray into the nature of money and the declining value thereof, November 1959: Challenge: The Magazine of Economic Affairs, vol. 8, no. 2
 Automation and Unemployment – An Oft-Exploded Myth Revives, March 5, 1962: Barron's
 The Other Revolution of '76, Fall 1973: Modern Age
 Who is the Real Employer? – The True Source of Jobs, 1976: Chamber of Commerce of the United States
 In Defense of Millionaires, February 1981: The Freeman
 Defending the Rich, October 16, 1986: The Chattanooga Times
 The Free Market Reader, 1988: Mises Institute
 Take a Hard Look At Transfers, Spring 1990: The Campbell Entrepreneur, vol. 13, no. 1
 The Business Outlook: Short War – Short Recession, February 13, 1991: Anchor Financial Group Meeting – Raleigh, NC
 America's Second Democracy, April 4, 1991: Campbell University Honors Banquet
 Bulging Budget Transfers, June 29, 1992: The Washington Times
 Capital Day, 1998, May 1998: The Free Market, vol. 16, no. 5
 Free Markets: The Status Quo vs. America's Other Democracy, January 23, 1999: CaptiveAire meeting – Tulsa, OK
 Free Trade and Capitalism: America's Other Democracy, April 1, 1999: Vital Speeches of the Day, vol. 65, no. 12
 Drumbeat Against Capitalism, August 2, 1999: Investor's Business Daily
 The Golden Rule and the Free Market, c. 2000
 Economic Freedom Spreads Globally As Adam Smith's lessons Take Hold, April 10, 2000: Investor's Business Daily
 Capitalism Appraised: A new look at mankind's greatest achievement, July 3, 2001: The Washington Times
 WHP Remarks, Capital Research Center, April 9, 2002: The Free Market, vol. 20, no. 9
 Capitalism: The Greatest Charity, September 2002: The Free Market, vol. 20, no. 9
 When Government Is the Problem, January 26, 2003: The Washington Times
 America's Greatest Democracy, July 29, 2003
 The Meaning of Market Democracy, December 2003: The Free Market, vol. 21, no. 12
 A Self-Defeating System: The problem with welfare, December 9, 2003: The Washington Times
 Seven Principles of Sound Public Policy, March 2004: Economic Club of Detroit
 The Power to Destroy, April 1, 2004
 Free to Prosper: Ranking countries' liberty and growth, August 31, 2004: The Washington Times
 The Democracy of the Market, November 2005: The Free Market, vol. 26, no. 11
 Economics in One Lesson: With Apologies to Henry Hazlitt, August 28, 2006: Shaftesbury Conference (John Locke Foundation)
 World Peace Through World Trade, November 20, 2006
 Disenfranchising America's Great Democracy, March 29, 2007
 Peterson's Law of Inflation, August 28, 2007
 America's Other Democracy: Politics and Economics at Work, April 3, 2008
 Two Manifestos, Two Revolutions, August 5, 2008
 Anti-State, Anti-War, Pro-Market, June 24, 2009: The Washington Times
 The Accelerator and Say's Law, December 8, 2011: On Freedom and Free Enterprise: Essays in Honor of Ludwig von Mises (1956)
 Capitalism: Our Greatest Charity and Democracy
 Forward with Uneconomics?
 Peterson's Law: Featuring America's Other Democracy and the Forgotten Man
 Peterson's Law: Or Why Things Go Wrong
 Postal Status Quo or Ayn Rand Millenium?
 Who Really Pays Business Taxes?

Education 
 School Values, Public and Private, April 1997: The Free Market, vol. 15, no. 4
 Public Education's Cardinal Sin, April 22, 2003: Campbell University
 Leave No Child Behind: Capitalism reform in education, January 27, 2004: The Washington Times

Entrepreneurship 
 Entrepreneurship, the Possible Dream, November 1985: The Freeman

Morals 
 Natural Law and Its Law-Breaker Extraordinary, February 26, 2004
 Mencken vs. Lincoln, April 14, 2009

Politics 
 The Greatest Show on Earth, August 11, 1956: Time & Tide
 Should We Trade With the Communists?, April 1956: Harvard Business Review, vol. 37, no. 2
 The Taproots of Political Corruption, December 1990: The Freeman
 A Dictionary of Conservative and Libertarian Thought (Reviewed by Peterson), May 1992: The Freeman
 Imperial Rights Regimen, July 16, 1992: The Washington Times
 Stoning Nixon, May 1996
 Rational Ignorance or Citizenship Education, November 6, 1997: Dallas Fed Lunch
 Remarks to Marriott Ballston (VA) Residents, June 14, 2001
 The Forgotten Man: How Americans Fare in Their Two Democracies, June 22, 2002: A Strategy for High Schoolers—Young America's Foundation, Arlington, VA
 Freedom and Prosperity: Together, they are the coming thing, December 17, 2002: The Washington Times
 Huffington turned by the tide: Author takes selective swipes at America's greedy, February 26, 2003: The Washington Times
 Strange bedfellows: The liaison between politics and science, November 4, 2003: The Washington Times
 Constitutional Rights?: Preserving the Founders' Intent, April 20, 2004: The Washington Times
 America's Other Democracy, November 5, 2004
 The Muddle of the Road, November 10, 2004
 Back to basics: America's democratic origins, December 27, 2004: The Washington Times
 The Endless Muddle East Imbroglio: Perpetual War for Perpetual Peace?, August 24, 2006
 Legacy Lost: GOP's big government, February 27, 2007: The Washington Times
 More Liberty Means Less Government: Our Founders Knew This Well (reviewed by Peterson)

On Mises 
 Ludwig von Mises: Thoughts and Memories, 1971: Toward Liberty (Institute of Humane Studies)
 Memories of Ludwig von Mises, May 1987: The Free Market (Mises Institute)
 Discovering Mises: A Turning Point, November 13, 2003
 Mises in New York, October 8, 2005: The Economics of Fascism
 Mises in America, 2009

Miscellaneous 
 One Harlem, Then the Other, August 11, 1984: The New York Times
 The Pilgrims' Turkey of an Idea, November 21, 1990
 For Dancers Only: Remembering Swing, April 1994: Chronicles

References

External links 
 RIP: William Peterson from the Cato Institute
 RIP: William Peterson from LewRockwell.com
 Schlarbaum Award Acceptance Speech by William H. Peterson
 William Peterson's Mises Daily Article Archive
 A Tribute to William H. Peterson by Thomas DiLorenzo, 1921–2012 Presented at the Austrian Economics Research Conference on 21 March 2013 at the Ludwig von Mises Institute in Auburn, Alabama.
 A Tribute to William H. Peterson, 1921–2012 Presented at the Austrian Economics Research Conference on 21 March 2013 at the Ludwig von Mises Institute in Auburn, Alabama.
 A Tribute to William H. Peterson, 1921–2012 Presented at the Austrian Economics Research Conference on 21 March 2013 at the Ludwig von Mises Institute in Auburn, Alabama.

1921 births
2012 deaths
American economists
American libertarians
Austrian School economists
Campbell University faculty
Columbia University alumni
Harvard Business School alumni
New York University alumni
New York University faculty
United States Navy personnel of World War II
University of Tennessee at Chattanooga faculty